Changzhou Trina International School (CZTIS) is a Pre-School/K-12 educational institution located in the Xinbei District of Changzhou, Jiangsu, China. 

The school, which opened in 2012, is a joint venture commissioned by the Changzhou Government's Department of Education and partially funded by Trina Solar, hence the addition of Trina to the name.  (NYSE:TSL). 

As of the 2015–2016 academic year, CZTIS offers an IGCSE program and is accredited by Cambridge International Examinations.

External links

References 

International schools in China
Private schools in China
Schools in China
Cambridge schools in China
Education in Changzhou